Charokhchi Mahalleh (also Romanized as Charokhchī Maḩalleh) is a village in Goli Jan Rural District, in the Central District of Tonekabon County, Mazandaran Province, Iran. At the 2006 census, its population was 97, in total of 32 families.

References 

Populated places in Tonekabon County